"Sky's the Limit" is a Swedish 2009 English language song by Ola Svensson that reached number one on the Swedish Singles Chart on 10 July 2009, where it stayed for one week.

Charts

References

2009 singles
Number-one singles in Sweden
Ola Svensson songs
2009 songs
Songs written by Ola Svensson
Songs written by J-Son